Pierwsza komunia, drugie śniadanie, trzecia Rzeczpospolita - (Polish First Communion, second breakfast, third Rzeczpospolita, second breakfast is a Polish idiom for lunch) is a studio album released by the Polish punk rock band Big Cyc in 1997.

Track listing
"Guma" (The Rubber)
"Impreza w klubie harcerza" (Party at the Boy Scout Club)
"Zbyszek Kieliszek i koleżanka Szklanka" (Zbyszek the Stemware and girlfriend the Shot glass)
"Tylko mamona" (Only Money)
"Ballada o ścierwojadach" (Ballad of carrion-eaters)
"Koliber 66 (Zjeb od Doroty)" 
"Światem rządzą kobiety" (Women rule the world)
"Schemat" (Scheme)
"Taniec lekkich goryli" (Light gorilla dance) - cover of Bielizna
"Wakacje z dygnitarzem" (Holidays with a VIP)
"Na bankiecie" (At a banquet)
"Twoja niemoc rodzi przemoc" (Your infirmity causes brutality)

Credits
Dżej Dżej – bass guitar, lead vocal
Dżery – drums, vocal
Piękny Roman – lead guitar, vocal
Skiba – vocal, lyrics

References

1996 albums
Big Cyc albums